Strada statale 407 Basentana (SS 407) is a motorway that follows the course of the Basento river from Potenza to Metaponto, entirely in Basilicata.

References 

407
Transport in Basilicata